2006 Collegiate Draft of Major League Lacrosse

References

Major League Lacrosse Collegiate Draft
Major League Lacrosse